Amediella may refer to:

 A genus of gall midges in the family Cecidomyiidae, Amediella (fly)
 A monotypic subgenus of lesser dung flies in the genus Minilimosina, Minilimosina endrodyi